N-(2'-Fluoroethyl-)-3β-(4'-chlorophenyl)-2β-(3'-phenylisoxazol-5'-yl)nortropane (FE-β-CPPIT) is a cocaine analogue.

See also
List of cocaine analogues

References

Tropanes
Dopamine reuptake inhibitors
Stimulants
Chloroarenes
Organofluorides
Isoxazoles